Bryce is a given name. Notable people with the name include:

Male 
Bryce Aiken (born 1996), American basketball player
Bryce Alderson (born 1994), Canadian soccer player
Bryce Alford (born 1995), American basketball player
Bryce Avary (born 1982), American musician, who plays under the name The Rocket Summer
Bryce Baringer (born 1999), American football player
Bryce Bayer (1929-2012), American scientist
Bryce Beeston (born 1947), New Zealand cyclist
Bryce Bennett (born 1984), American politician
Bryce Bennett (alpine skier) (born 1992), American alpine skier
Bryce Boarman (born 1990), American soccer player
Bryce Van Brabant (born 1991), American ice hockey player
Bryce Brentz (born 1988), American baseball left fielder
Bryce Brown (born 1991), American football running back
Bryce Brown (basketball) (born 1997), American basketball player
Bryce Chudleigh Burt (1881-1943), British administrator
Bryce Callahan (born 1991), American football cornerback
Bryce Campbell (disambiguation), multiple people
Bryce Cartwright (born 1994), Australian Rugby League player
Bryce Chudak (born 1995), Canadian figure skater
Bryce Cooper (1905-1995), Australian cricketer
Bryce Cotton (born 1992), American basketball player
Bryce Courtenay (1933-2012), Australian-South African novelist
Bryce Crawford (1914-2011), American scientist
Bryce Davis (born 1989), American football center
Bryce Davison (born 1986), American figure skater
Bryce Dejean-Jones (1992-2016), American basketball player
Bryce Dessner (born 1976), American composer
Bryce DeWitt (1923-2004), American physicist
Bryce Douvier (born 1991), Austrian basketball player
Bryce W. Drennan (born 1963), American author
Bryce Drew (born 1974), American basketball coach
Bryce Duke (born 2001), American soccer player
Bryce Easton (born 1987), South African professional golfer
Bryce Edgmon (born 1961), American speaker
Bryce Fisher (born 1977), American football player
Bryce Florie (born 1970), American baseball player
Bryce Fullwood (born 1998), Australian racing driver
Bryce Fulton (1935-1976), Scottish footballer
Bryce Gaudry (1942-2019), Australian politician
Bryce Gibbs (disambiguation), multiple people
Bryce Goggin, American record producer
Bryce Gray (born 1827), Scottish-American merchant
Bryce Hager (born 1992), American football linebacker
Bryce Hall (American football) (born 1997), American football player
Bryce Hall (internet personality) (born 1999), American Internet celebrity
Bryce Hallett (born 1976), Canadian animator
Bryce Hamilton (born 2000), American basketball player
Bryce Harding, American record producer
Bryce Harland (1931-2006), New Zealand diplomat
Bryce Harlow (1916-1987), American congressional staff member
Bryce Harper (born 1992), American baseball player
Bryce Harris (born 1989), American football offensive tackle
Bryce Heem (born 1989), New Zealand rugby player
Bryce Hegarty (born 1992), Australian rugby union footballer
Bryce Hirschberg (born 1990), American film director
Bryce G. Hoffman (born 1969), American author
Bryce Hoppel (born 1997), American middle-distance runner
Bryce Hudson (born 1979), American painter
Bryce Huff (born 1997), American football player
Bryce Hunt (born 1982), American swimmer
Bryce Ives (born 1983), Australian theatre director
Bryce Jacobs, Australian composer
Bryce Janey, American blues rock musician
Bryce Jarvis (born 1997), American baseball player
Bryce Johnson (born 1977), American actor
 Bryce Johnson (baseball) (born 1995), American baseball player 
Bryce Jordan (1924-2016), American musicologist
Bryce Kanights, American photographer
Bryce Kendrick (born 1933), English biologist
Bryce Lampman (born 1982), American ice hockey player 
Bryce Lawrence (born 1970), New Zealand referee
Bryce Lindores (born 1986), Australian Paralympic tandem cyclist
Bryce Love (born 1997), American football player
Bryce Mackasey (1921-1999), Canadian politician
Bryce Marion (born 1996), American soccer player
Bryce Marlatt (born 1977), American politician 
Bryce McCall (born 1988), Canadian football defensive back
Bryce McGain (born 1972), Australian cricketer
Bryce McGowens (born 2002), American basketball player
Bryce Meredith (born 1995), American freestyle wrestler and graduated folkstyle wrestler
Bryce Miller (born 1982), American racing driver
Bryce Mitchell (born 1994), American mixed martial artist
Bryce Molder (born 1979), American professional golfer
Bryce Moon (born 1986), South African football player
Bryce Mortlock (1921-2004), Australian architect
Bryce Napier (born 1999), American racing driver
Bryce Papenbrook (born 1986), American voice actor
Bryce Parsons (born 2001), South African cricketer
Bryce Paup (born 1968), former American football player
Bryce Peila (born 1990), American football player
Bryce Perkins (born 1996), American football player
Bryce Petty (born 1991), American football quarterback
Bryce Pinkham (born 1982), American actor
Bryce Poe II (1924-2000), American Air Force four-star general
Bryce Postles (1931-2011), New Zealand cricketer
Bryce Quigley (born 1992), American football offensive tackle
Bryce Reeve (born 1968), American professor
Bryce Reeves (born 1966), American senator
Bryce Retzlaff (born 1991), Australian rules football player
Bryce Robins (born 1980), New Zealand-Japanese rugby union player
Bryce Robins (rugby union, born 1958), New Zealand rugby union player
Bryce Rohde (1923-2016), Australian jazz pianist
Bryce Rope (1923-2013), New Zealand rugby union coach
Bryce Salvador (born 1976), Canadian ice hockey defenceman
Bryce Shapley (born 1974), New Zealand cyclist
Bryce Soderberg (born 1980), Canadian musician
Bryce B. Smith (1878-1962), American mayor
Bryce J. Stevens (born 1957), New Zealand writer
Bryce Street (born 1998), Australian cricketer
Bryce Stringam (1920-2000), Canadian politician
Bryce Sweeting (born 1994), Canadian lacrosse player
Bryce Taylor (disambiguation), multiple people
Bryce Thompson (born 2002), American basketball player
Bryce Thompson (American football) (born 1999), American football player
Bryce Treggs (born 1994), American football wide receiver
Bryce Vine (born 1988), American rapper
Bryce Vissel, Australian neuroscientist
Bryce Walmsley (1881-1930), Australian politician
Bryce Walton (1918-1988), American fiction writer
Bryce Wandler (born 1979), Canadian former professional ice hockey goaltender
Bryce Washington (born 1996), American basketball player
Bryce Williams (disambiguation), multiple people
Bryce Wilson (born 1972), American record producer
Bryce Young (born 2001), American football player
Bryce Zabel (born 1954), American television producer

Female 
Bryce Dallas Howard (born 1981), American actress
Bryce Wettstein (born 2004), American skateboarder

Fictional Characters
Dr. Bryce Varley, fictional character in the TV series FlashForward
 Bryce Walker, a character in the novel and Netflix series 13 Reasons Why

See also
Brice (disambiguation), include listing of people with given name Brice
Bryce (surname)
Bryce (disambiguation)

English unisex given names
Scottish masculine given names